Paraclinus is a genus of labrisomid blennies native to eastern Pacific Ocean and the western Atlantic Ocean.

Species
There are currently 23 recognized species in this genus:
 Paraclinus altivelis (Lockington, 1881) (Topgallant blenny)
 Paraclinus arcanus R. Z. P. Guimarães & Bacellar, 2002
 Paraclinus barbatus V. G. Springer, 1955 (Goatee blenny)
 Paraclinus beebei C. Hubbs, 1952 (Pink blenny)
 Paraclinus cingulatus (Evermann & M. C. Marsh, 1899) (Coral blenny)
 Paraclinus ditrichus Rosenblatt & T. D. Parr, 1969 (Leastfoot blenny)
 Paraclinus fasciatus (Steindachner, 1876) (Banded blenny)
 Paraclinus fehlmanni V. G. Springer & Trist, 1969  
 Paraclinus grandicomis (N. Rosén, 1911) (Horned blenny)
 Paraclinus infrons J. E. Böhlke, 1960 (Bald blenny)
 Paraclinus integripinnis (R. Smith, 1880) (Reef finspot)
 Paraclinus magdalenae Rosenblatt & T. D. Parr, 1969 (Magdalena blenny)
 Paraclinus marmoratus (Steindachner, 1876) (Marbled blenny)
 Paraclinus mexicanus (C. H. Gilbert, 1904) (Mexican blenny)
 Paraclinus monophthalmus (Günther, 1861) (One-eyed blenny)
 Paraclinus naeorhegmis J. E. Böhlke, 1960 (Surf blenny)
 Paraclinus nigripinnis (Steindachner, 1867) (Blackfin blenny)
 Paraclinus rubicundus (Starks, 1913)
 Paraclinus sini C. Hubbs, 1952 (Flapscale blenny)
 Paraclinus spectator R. Z. P. Guimarães & Bacellar, 2002
 Paraclinus stephensi Rosenblatt & T. D. Parr, 1969 (Professor blenny)
 Paraclinus tanygnathus Rosenblatt & T. D. Parr, 1969 (Longjaw blenny)
 Paraclinus walkeri C. Hubbs, 1952 (San Quintin blenny)

References

 
Labrisomidae
Marine fish genera
Taxa named by François Mocquard